Trachysomus camelus is a species of beetle in the family Cerambycidae. It was described by Buquet in 1852. It is known from Brazil and French Guiana.

References

Onciderini
Beetles described in 1852